Juan Carlos I of Spain has received numerous decorations and honorary appointments as monarch of Spain. Spanish monarchical Titles or Style are listed in order of degrees of sovereignty, nobility, and honour.

Royal titles and styles

 5 January 1938 – 15 January 1941 His Royal Highness Infante Juan Carlos of Spain
 15 January 1941 - 21 July 1969 His Royal Highness The Prince of Asturias (titular)
 21 July 1969 - 22 November 1975 His Royal Highness  The Prince of Spain
 22 November 1975 - 19 June 2014 His Majesty The King of Spain
 19 June 2014 - Present His Majesty King Juan Carlos

As a grandson to deposed King Alfonso XIII, Juan Carlos was an Infante of Spain from birth. His father Infante Juan, Count of Barcelona became Head of the Royal House after his father's and elder brother's deaths and his other elder brother's renunciation. Juan Carlos thus became titular Prince of Asturias, the title traditionally held by the heir to the Spanish throne. In 1969, twelve years after the Law of Succession to the Headship of the State, the Spanish dictator Francisco Franco skipped Infante Juan and designated Juan Carlos as his successor, with the title Prince of Spain. On Franco's death in 1975, he thus became King of Spain.

The Spanish titles of Juan Carlos I as Monarch of Spain were as follows:
Note: Titles in Pretence marked with * are historical titles which are only nominal and ceremonial.

 King of Spain
 King of Castile, of León, of Aragon, of the Two Sicilies* (Naples and Sicily), of Jerusalem*, of Navarre, of Granada, of Toledo, of Valencia, of Galicia, of Majorca, of Seville, of Sardinia*, of Córdoba, of Corsica*, of Murcia, of Menorca, of Jaén, of the Algarves*, of Algeciras, of Gibraltar*, of the Canary Islands, of the East Indies* and West Indies* and of the Islands and Mainland of the Ocean Sea*;
 Archduke of Austria*;
 Duke of Burgundy*, of Brabant*, of Milan*, of Athens*, of Neopatras* (New Patras) and of Limburg*;
 Count of Habsburg*, of Flanders*, of Tyrol*, of Roussillon* and of Barcelona;
 Lord of Biscay and of Molina

National honours 

  Sovereign Grand Master (1975–2014) and 1,171st Knight (1941) of the Royal Spanish Order of the Golden Fleece
  Grand Master (1975–2014) and Knight Collar (1962) of the Order of Charles III
  Grand Master (1975–2014) of the Order of Isabella the Catholic
  Grand Master (1975–2014) of the Order of Civil Merit
  Grand Master (1975–2014) of the Civil Order of Alfonso X, the Wise
  Grand Master (1975–2014) of the Order of St. Raymond of Peñafort
   Grand Master (1977–2014) of the Order of Cisneros
   Grand Master (1975–2014) of the Military Orders of Montesa,  Alcántara,  Calatrava and  Santiago
  Grand Master (1975–2014) of the Royal and Military Order of Saint Hermenegild
  Grand Master (1975–2014) of the Royal and Military Order of St. Ferdinand

Foreign honours
 :
  Order of the Athir
 : 
  Collar of the Order of the Liberator General San Martín (1 December 1978)
 :
  Grand Star of the Decoration of Honour for Services to the Republic of Austria
 :
  Grand Cordon of the Order of Leopold
 :
  Grand Collar of the Order of the Southern Cross (1991)
  Bulgarian Royal Family:
  Knight of the Royal Order of Saints Cyril and Methodius
 :
  Collar of the Grand Cross of the Order of Merit
 :
  Grand Collar of the Order of Boyaca
  Collar of the Order of San Carlos
 :
  Grand Cordon of the National Order of the Leopard
 :
  Grand Cross of Gold of the Order of Juan Mora Fernández
 :
  Grand Cross with Collar of the Order of the White Lion
 :
  Knight of the Order of the Elephant (17 March 1980)
 :
  Collar of the Order of Merit of Duarte, Sánchez and Mella
 :
  Grand Collar of the National Order of San Lorenzo
 :
  Grand Cordon of the Order of the Nile
 :
  Grand Cross with Golden Star of the Order of José Matías Delgado, Special Class
 :
  Collar of the Order of the Cross of Terra Mariana
 :
  Grand Cross with Collar of the National Order
  Ethiopian Imperial Family:
  Knight Grand Collar of the Imperial Order of Solomon
  Knight Grand Cordon of the Imperial Order of the Seal of Solomon
 :
  Grand Cross with Collar of the Order of the White Rose
 :
  Grand Cross of the Order of the Legion of Honour
  Grand Cross of the National Order of Merit
 :
  Grand Cross Special Class of the Order of Merit of the Federal Republic of Germany
 Greece:
  Greek Republic:
  Grand Cross of the Order of the Redeemer
  Greek Royal Family:
 Knight Grand Cross of the Royal Order of the Redeemer
  Knight Grand Cross with Collar of the Royal Order of Saints George and Constantine
 Recipient of the Commemorative Badge for the Centenary of the Greek Royal House
 :
  Collar of the Order of the Quetzal
 :
  Knight of the Collar of the Order of the Holy Sepulchre
  Knight of the Collar of the Order of Pius IX
 :
  Grand Cross with Gold Star of the Order of Francisco Morazán
 :
  Grand Cross with Chain the Order of Merit of the Republic of Hungary
 :
  Grand Cross with Chain of the Order of the Falcon
 :
  Adipurna Grand Cross of the Order of the Star of the Republic of Indonesia
  Imperial State of Iran:
  Member 1st Class of the Imperial Order of Pahlavi
  Recipient of the Commemorative Medal of the 2,500 year Celebration of the Persian Empire
 Italy:
 :
  Knight Grand Cross with Collar of the Order of Merit of the Italian Republic
  Italian Royal Family:
  Knight of the Supreme Order of the Most Holy Annunciation
  Two Sicilian Royal Family (Hispano-Neapolitan branch):
  Knight of the Order of Saint Januarius
  Two Sicilian Royal Family (Hispano-Neapolitan branch):
  Bailiff Knight Grand Cross with Collar of Justice of the Sacred Military Constantinian Order of Saint George
 :
  Member of the Order of Excellence
 :
  Collar of the Order of the Chrysanthemum
 :
  Grand Cordon with Collar of the Order of al-Hussein bin Ali
 :
 Recipient of the Royal Mahendra Chain
  Member of the Royal Order of Honour
 :
  Collar of the Order of Mubarak the Great
 :
  Commander Grand Cross with Chain of the Order of the Three Stars
 :
  Member Extraordinary Grade of the Order of Merit
 :
  Grand Cross with Collar of the Order of Vytautas the Great
 :
  Knight of the Order of the Gold Lion of the House of Nassau
 :
  Honorary Companion of Honour with Collar of the National Order of Merit
 :
  Collar of the Order of the Aztec Eagle
 :
 Grand Officer of the Order of Saint-Charles
 :
 Member Special Class of the Order of Muhammad
 :
  Knight Grand Cross of the Order of the Netherlands Lion
  Grand Cross of the Order of the House of Orange
  Recipient of the Wedding Medal of Princess Beatrix of the Netherlands and Claus van Amsberg
 :
  Grand Commander of the Order of the Niger
 :
  Grand Cross with Collar of the Order of St. Olav
 :
  First Class military division of the Order of Oman
 :
  Collar of the Order of Manuel Amador Guerrero
  Extraordinary Grand Cross of the Order of Vasco Núñez de Balboa
 :
  Grand Cross with Diamonds of the Order of the Sun of Peru
 :
  Grand Collar of the Order of Lakandula
  Grand Collar of the Order of Sikatuna
  Knight Grand Cross of the Order of the Knights of Rizal
 :
  Knight of the Order of the White Eagle
 Portugal:
 :
  Grand Collar of the Order of the Tower and Sword
  Grand Cross of the Order of Christ
  Grand Collar of the Military Order of Saint James of the Sword
  Grand Cross of the Order of Aviz
  Grand Collar of the Order of Prince Henry
  Grand Collar of the Order of Liberty
  Portuguese Royal Family:
  Knight Grand Cross with Collar of the Royal Order of the Immaculate Conception of Vila Viçosa
 :
  Collar of the Order of the Star of Romania
 :
  Grand Cross of the Order of the Lion
 :
  First Cross of the Order of the White Double Cross
 :
  Bailiff Knight Grand Cross of the Sovereign Military Order of Malta
 :
  Grand Collar of the Order of Good Hope
 :
  Member of the Grand Order of Mugunghwa
 :
  Knight of the Royal Order of the Seraphim (5 October 1979)
 :
  Knight of the Order of the Rajamitrabhorn
  Knight of the Order of the Royal House of Chakri
 :
  Collar of the Order of Zayed
 :
  Stranger Knight of the Order of the Garter (970th member; 1988)
  Recipient of the Royal Victorian Chain (1986)
:
 Medal of the Oriental Republic of Uruguay (1996)
 :
  Collar of the Order of the Liberator

Awards
: Charlemagne Prize (1982)
: Laureate of the Russian Federation National Award (2010) for Outstanding Achievement in the Humanitarian Field
: Jean Monnet Award of the Jean Monnet Foundation for Europe for his work on integrating Spain into the European Community
:
Member of the Sons of the American Revolution organisation
Freedom medal of the Roosevelt Institute (1996)
World Statesman Award (1997) of the Appeal of Conscience Foundation
 Olympic Order (IOC)
 UNESCO
International Simón Bolívar Prize (1983)
Félix Houphouët-Boigny Peace Prize (1994)

International sovereign organisations 
 International Order of St. Hubertus
Protector of the International Order of St. Hubertus

Honorific eponyms

Madrid: Rey Juan Carlos University
Madrid: Juan Carlos I Park
Spanish ship Juan Carlos I (L61)
Antarctica: Juan Carlos I Antarctic Base on Livingston Island in the South Shetland Islands
King Juan Carlos Prize in Economics

New York City: King Juan Carlos I of Spain Center at New York University Graduate School of Arts and Science, to foster the study of Hispanic culture and language

Other honours

Instituto Cervantes: Honorary President 21 March 199119 June 2014

Basilica di Santa Maria Maggiore: Protocanon (ex officio) 22 November 197519 June 2014
Basilica di San Paolo fuori le Mura: Protocanon (ex officio) 22 November 197519 June 2014
Other:
 : Honorary President of the Organization of Ibero-American States

Scholastic 
The king has been the recipient of numerous honorary doctorates and degrees, including:

Honorary doctorates

University of Buenos Aires

University of Paris (La Sorbonne)

University of Bologna

University of Santo Tomas

University of Cambridge
University of Oxford

Harvard University
Southern Methodist University (where, in 2001, he formally opened the Meadows Museum, housing the largest collection of Spanish art outside Spain)
Georgetown University,  Honorary Doctor of Laws

Degrees

University of Utrecht in the Netherlands (25 October 2001).

New York University

Spanish Royal Academies
 Spanish Royal Academies Board: High Patron (ex officio) 22 November 197519 June 2014

Other
 Gold Medal of the Jean Monnet Foundation for Europe, in 1996.
 Elected to the American Philosophical Society in 1992.

Military rank
 197322 November 1975: Brigadier general, Spanish Army
 22 November 197519 June 2014: Captain General of the Spanish Armed Forces

See also
 Juan Carlos I of Spain
 List of honours of the Spanish Royal Family by country
 List of titles and honours of the Spanish Crown
 Military career and honours of Francisco Franco

Notes
*: Orders of the Kingdom of Spain with the grand mastership assumed by Francisco Franco as Spanish Head of State.

**:  Dynastic orders with the domain remained by Infante Juan, Count of Barcelona, Head of the Spanish Royal House, until his formal renounce in 1977.

References
 HM The King, Official site of the Royal Household of Spain
   List of titles and honours of the Spanish Crown. dhistoria.com

Lists of titles by person of Spain
List of titles and honours of Juan Carlos I of Spain

Grand Masters of the Order of the Golden Fleece
Grand Masters of the Order of Isabella the Catholic
Recipients of the Order of Isabella the Catholic
Collars of the Order of Isabella the Catholic
Knights Grand Cross of the Order of Isabella the Catholic
Grand Masters of the Royal and Military Order of San Hermenegild
Grand Masters of the Order of Montesa
Grand Masters of the Order of Alcántara
Grand Masters of the Order of Calatrava
Grand Masters of the Order of Santiago

Collars of the Order of the Liberator General San Martin
Collars of the Order of the White Lion
Grand Collars of the Order of Prince Henry
Grand Collars of the Order of Lakandula
Grand Collars of the Order of Liberty
Grand Collars of the Order of Saint James of the Sword
Grand Crosses with Chain of the Order of Merit of the Republic of Hungary (civil)
Knights Grand Cross with Collar of the Order of Merit of the Italian Republic
Recipients of the Collar of the Order of the Cross of Terra Mariana
Bailiffs Grand Cross of Honour and Devotion of the Sovereign Military Order of Malta
Grand Crosses with Golden Chain of the Order of Vytautas the Great

Extraordinary Grades of the Order of Merit (Lebanon)
Grand Commanders of the Order of the Niger
Grand Croix of the Légion d'honneur
Grand Cross of the Ordre national du Mérite
Grand Crosses of the Order of Aviz
Grand Crosses of the Order of Christ (Portugal)
Knights Grand Cross of the Order of the Immaculate Conception of Vila Viçosa

Honorary Companions of Honour with Collar of the National Order of Merit (Malta)
Extra Knights Companion of the Garter
Knights of Malta
Knights of the Golden Fleece of Spain
Recipients of the Grand Star of the Decoration for Services to the Republic of Austria
Grand Crosses of the Order of José Matías Delgado
Grand Crosses with Diamonds of the Order of the Sun of Peru
Grand Crosses of the Order of Christopher Columbus
Juan Carlos I of Spain
Grand Crosses Special Class of the Order of Merit of the Federal Republic of Germany
Grand Crosses of the Order of the House of Orange
Recipients of the Order of the White Eagle (Poland)
Members of the American Philosophical Society